The Flying Squirrel is a 1954 animated short film featuring Donald Duck.  It was released by Walt Disney Productions.

Plot
Donald Duck owns a peanut cart and has set up in a park.  A flying squirrel comes along and Donald recruits him to help tie his sign to a tree with the promise of a peanut.  However, the peanut that Donald gives him turns out to be bad  and won't give him another one.  This causes the squirrel to start a battle with Donald.

Voice cast
Clarence Nash as Donald Duck

Home media
The short was released on November 11, 2008 on Walt Disney Treasures: The Chronological Donald, Volume Four: 1951-1961.

References

External links
 
 

1954 films
1954 animated films
1950s Disney animated short films
Donald Duck short films
Films produced by Walt Disney
1950s English-language films
Films scored by Oliver Wallace